The  Holden Beach Bridge carries NC 130 across the Atlantic Intracoastal Waterway (ICW), connecting the town of Holden Beach to the mainland. The  structure, built under contract to the North Carolina Department of Transportation, consists of 20 approach spans of Type III and IV prestressed concrete AASHTO girders and 3 channel spans of prestressed, precast box girders.

History
Before the construction of the ICW in the late 1930s, Holden Beach residents got to the mainland via a log bridge.  Ferry service began after the ICW was completed and lasted up till 1954. At that time the beach town was developing so fast the ferry could not handle the traffic during the summer months, especially on weekends. Sometimes cars would be backed up to the beach and then down Ocean Boulevard up to a quarter of a mile waiting for the ferry. In 1953, a swing bridge started to be constructed about 1/2 mile west of the ferry landing, one which was built well enough to  survive the onslaught of Hurricane Hazel.  But here again due to the large increase in both boat and vehicular traffic, this bridge was replaced by the current high rise structure on May 13, 1986.

Design and construction
Built by the URS Corporation located in Raleigh NC (now a part of AECOM), the three main channel spans that cross the ICW are 86, 117’ and 100’ long. Federal and state funds were appropriated in the amount of $4.1 million to construct the bridge with the driving factor in the bridge's design the need to obtain a 65’ vertical clearance over the ICW at mean high water (U.S. Coast Guard requirement). Given the narrow width of the island, the bridge had to curve to the west, otherwise the slope would have been too steep were it to intersect with the ocean front road. From an engineering standpoint, this  necessitated  extensive crest and sag vertical curvature in the bridge design.

References

Road bridges in North Carolina
Buildings and structures in Brunswick County, North Carolina
Concrete bridges in the United States